The 6th Anti-aircraft Missiles Brigade "Râmnic" (Brigada 6 Rachete Antiaeriene) was an anti-aircraft brigade of the Romanian Land Forces. It was one of the oldest anti-aircraft military units of the Romanian Armed Forces, being formed during World War I. The brigade was subordinated in 2005 to the 1st Territorial Army Corps, and its headquarters were located in Râmnicu Sărat. The unit operated the S-75 "Volhov" and the modern MIM-23 Hawk surface-to-air missile systems. The 6th Anti-aircraft Brigade was undergoing a major structural reorganization process and it was disbanded in 2006.  The brigade's last commander was Brigade General Sandu Serea.

Structure (2005)
 6th Anti-aircraft Missile Operational Brigade – Râmnicu Sărat
 50th Mixed Anti-aircraft Missiles Regiment "Andrei Mureşianu" – Floreşti
51st Anti-aircraft Missiles Regiment "Pelendava" – Craiova
 53rd Mixed Anti-aircraft Missiles Regiment "Trophaeum Traiani" – Medgidia

External links
   Official Site of the Romanian Land Forces
  Official Site of the 1st Territorial Army Corps

Brigades of Romania
Military units and formations established in the 1910s
Air defence units and formations of the Romanian Army